The 1983 Colorado Buffaloes football team represented the University of Colorado in the Big Eight Conference during the 1983 NCAA Division I-A football season. Led by second-year head coach Bill McCartney, the Buffaloes finished at 4–7 (2–5 in Big 8, tied for sixth), their fifth consecutive losing season. Home games were played on campus at  Folsom Field in Boulder, Colorado.

Colorado revived the dormant intrastate rivalry with Colorado State after 25 years, and posted a winning record after three games for the first time since 1978. 

Down by two touchdowns in the season finale, junior quarterback Steve Vogel came off the bench and rallied CU to a 17-point home win over last-place Kansas State to avoid the conference cellar.

Schedule

Awards
TE Dave Hestra
All-American Honorable Mention (AP)
All-Big Eight
CB Victor Scott
Playboy Preseason All-American
All-American Honorable Mention (AP)
All-Big Eight

References

External links
University of Colorado Athletics – 1983 football roster
Sports-Reference – 1983 Colorado Buffaloes

Colorado
Colorado Buffaloes football seasons
Colorado Buffaloes football